USS The Sullivans may refer to:

, is an  launched in 1995 and currently in service

United States Navy ship names